Stuart Benjamin Munsch (born 1962) is a United States Navy admiral who serves as the commander of United States Naval Forces Europe-Africa and commander of Allied Joint Force Command Naples since June 27, 2022. He most recently served as the director for joint force development, J7, of the Joint Staff from 2020 to 2022.

Early life and education
Munsch, a native of North Dakota, graduated from the Naval Academy in 1985 with a Bachelor of Science in electrical engineering. At the United States Naval Academy, he was brigade commander of the Class of 1985 and was an All-American and national champion pistol shooter. Selected for a Rhodes Scholarship, he attended Oxford University and earned a Bachelor of Arts and a Master of Arts in philosophy, politics and economics.

Naval career
In 1999, Munsch reported ashore to U.S. Pacific Command, where he served in the Plans and Policy Directorate (J5) prior to becoming deputy executive assistant to the commander. He then was selected for a White House Fellowship and served as special assistant to the Secretary of Agriculture.

Munsch commanded  from 2002 to 2005, followed by duty in the Pentagon as the military assistant to the Deputy Secretary of Defense and then as executive assistant to the director, submarine warfare, Office of the Chief of Naval Operations (OPNAV N87).

Munsch commanded Submarine Development Squadron (DEVRON) 5 from 2008 to 2010 and then returned to the Pentagon to head the Navy Strategy branch (OPNAV N513). Selected for flag rank, he was reassigned as deputy director, undersea warfare (OPNAV N97).

Sent overseas to Japan and Bahrain, Munsch commanded Submarine Group 7 and Task Forces 74 and 54 from 2013 to 2015, followed by duty in the Pentagon as the senior military assistant to the Deputy Secretary of Defense. In 2017 Munsch reported to OPNAV N3/N5 as the assistant and in 2018 became the deputy chief of naval operations for operations, plans and strategy. In 2019 he established and served as the initial deputy chief of naval operations for warfighting development, N7. He assumed his role as director for joint force development (J7) in 2020.

Awards and decorations

References

Living people
Place of birth missing (living people)
Recipients of the Defense Distinguished Service Medal
Recipients of the Defense Superior Service Medal
Recipients of the Legion of Merit
Recipients of the Navy Distinguished Service Medal
1962 births